Trevor Day School is an independent day school in New York City in the borough of Manhattan.

History 

It was founded in 1930 as The Day School for the Church of the Heavenly Rest, an Episcopalian church located on Fifth Avenue at 90th street. In 1997, the school was renamed in honor of the late Paul Trevor, an early Board President.

In 1991, the school took over the Walden Lincoln School (which itself was a merger of two schools, Walden and New Lincoln) and acquired the Goodman Building at 1 West 88th Street. It refurbished the building and until May 2015 used it to house the Upper School opened for sixth through twelfth grades. The Goodman Building is now home to the Lower School for Pre K through fifth grade.

Recently, Trevor Day bought 312 East 95th Street by Ken Kal LLC, which would now be the home for the upper school. The new building, which opened in May 2015, is approximately 101,243 square-feet and 12 stories high. The new building uses a sustainable geothermal heating and cooling system that reduces energy consumption. Trevor Day School is the first school in Manhattan to use geothermal technology.

Scott R. Reisinger became the Head of School of Trevor in July 2014.

Advancements in Education 

 Trevor Day School implemented common spaces in the late 1970s. These spaces allow students to collaborate with others and talk to their teachers. Common spaces are still a big part of Trevor to this day.
 Trevor has been using family conferences for over 20 years. Family conferences allow the student to be a part of the meeting and share his or her thoughts on the school year.
 Trevor has implemented computing into education. Computers were first used at Trevor in 1982 and 150 laptops were purchased in 1996.

References

External links

Educational institutions established in 1930
Private K-12 schools in Manhattan
1930 establishments in New York City